Fauna is the debut studio album by Danish singer Oh Land. It was released in Denmark on 10 November 2008 by Danish independent label Fake Diamond Records. The album received generally positive acclaim in her home country.

To celebrate 10 years since the release of Fauna, on 10 November 2018, it was released on a 12" limited light blue 180g vinyl, packaged in a gatefold cover and accompanied by a 16-page booklet. The vinyl, including signed versions, was made available via PledgeMusic.

Track listing

Personnel
Credits adapted from the liner notes of Fauna.

References

2008 debut albums
Oh Land albums